Alex Nicolao Telles (born 15 December 1992) is a Brazilian professional footballer who plays as a left-back for La Liga club Sevilla, on loan from Premier League club Manchester United, and the Brazil national team.

Telles started his career at Brazilian Série D side Juventude, before being sold to Série A side Grêmio in 2013. That year, he was voted the best left-back in the league. In January 2014, Telles signed with Turkish Süper Lig club Galatasaray, winning various trophies including a league title, two Turkish Cups and the Turkish Super Cup, only to be loaned to Serie A team Inter Milan during the 2015–16 season. 

In July 2016, Telles was sold to Primeira Liga side FC Porto, where he established himself as one of the best left-backs in the league. He made almost 200 appearances for Porto and won four trophies, including two league titles, one Taça de Portugal and one Supertaça Cândido de Oliveira, as well as being named in the Primeira Liga Team of the Year for three consecutive seasons. Telles' performances sparked the interest of several European clubs, and in October 2020, he signed for Manchester United for an initial €18 million (£15.4 million).

Born in Brazil, Telles also holds Italian citizenship, but ended up representing Brazil at international level. He made his senior international debut in 2019.

Club career

Juventude and Grêmio
Telles was born in Caxias do Sul, a city in the Brazilian state of Rio Grande do Sul. At the age of eight, he began playing football with the neighbouring kids and was later enrolled to a youth academy of Esporte Clube Juventude.

Telles began his professional career with Juventude, making his debut on 24 January 2011 against São José-PA. He scored his first goal on 20 August in a 1–1 home draw against Cruzeiro.

In December, Telles was transferred to Grêmio after a partnership was established with Juventude. He made his Grêmio debut on 3 February 2013 against Internacional. On 26 May, Telles made his Série A debut, starting in a 2–0 home win against Náutico.

Galatasaray
On 22 January 2014, after long negotiations, Telles completed a move to Turkish club Galatasaray for €6 million, signing a contract that will keep him with the club until 2018. He made his debut two weeks later, starting in a 3–0 win against Tokatspor for the campaign's Turkish Cup, and made his maiden Süper Lig debut in a 3–0 home victory against Eskişehirspor on 8 February 2014. Telles made his first assist for the club against Antalyaspor in a 2–2 away game on 17 February. He also scored his first goal for Galatasaray against Akhisar Belediyespor on 8 March in a 6–1 home win.

In August 2015, there were rumours mentioning Telles as a good choice to fill the place made by the departure of left-back Filipe Luís at Chelsea. In response to the rumour, Galatasaray manager Hamza Hamzaoğlu said the club would only be tempted by an acceptable offer.

Loan to Inter Milan
On 31 August 2015, Galatasaray agreed to let Telles join Italian club Internazionale of Serie A on a one-year loan for a €1.3 million fee, in addition to €250,000 if Inter qualify for the group stage of the 2016–17 UEFA Champions League. The deal included a buyout option for €8.5 million, letting Internazionale make the move permanent when the loan deal is finished. Telles reunited with Internazionale manager Roberto Mancini in Italy, who previously coached him at Galatasaray.

He made his debut for the club on 13 September in the 2015–16 Serie A matchday 3 against city rivals Milan, playing the entirety of the match as Inter won 1–0.

Porto
On 12 July 2016, Portuguese side FC Porto announced the signing of Telles for a €6.5 million fee. According to a Galatasaray press release, the Istanbul club reserved a further 10% of any added value in a future transfer deal. The following day, after signing a five-year contract, he stated: "I ambition titles, I ambition a very beautiful story. I have recently commented with my relatives that I do not want to come here in passing, I want to leave a legacy." On 12 August, in a 3–1 away win against Rio Ave, he marked his league debut and first competitive match with a poor performance and subsequent expulsion. Despite the rough start, Telles gradually cemented himself in the team's starting eleven, scoring his first goal when facing rivals Boavista in a 3–1 home victory at Estádio do Dragão.

Manchester United
On 5 October 2020, Manchester United had agreed a deal in principle to sign Telles for a fee believed to be £15.4 million. The transfer was completed and Telles was announced as a United player that day. He made his debut playing as a left wing-back on 20 October in a 2–1 win over Paris Saint-Germain in the UEFA Champions League group stage. On 29 September 2021, Telles scored his first goal for Manchester United with a left-footed volley from outside the penalty area in a 2–1 home win against Villarreal CF in the 2021–22 UEFA Champions League group stage.

Loan to Sevilla
On 4 August 2022, Telles was loaned to La Liga club Sevilla until the end of the 2022–23 season.

International career
Although he was born in Brazil, Telles also has an Italian passport, making him in the past eligible to represent Italy national team. In October 2016, Telles said that he would "welcome" a call-up from the "Azzurri", adding that his great-grandparents are Italian and he feels Italian. In March 2019, however, he received his first call-up to the Brazil national team. He made his debut for Brazil on 23 March 2019 in a friendly against Panama, as a starter.

On 7 November 2022, Telles was named in the squad for the 2022 FIFA World Cup. He was ruled out for the rest of the competition after picking up a right knee injury in the final group stage match against Cameroon.

Style of play
Telles is an offensive full back and is described as a skilled, quick and playmaking defender.

Career statistics

Club

International

Honours
Juventude
Copa FGF: 2011, 2012

Galatasaray
Süper Lig: 2014–15
Turkish Cup: 2013–14, 2014–15
Turkish Super Cup: 2015

Porto
Primeira Liga: 2017–18, 2019–20
Taça de Portugal: 2019–20
Supertaça Cândido de Oliveira: 2018

Manchester United
UEFA Europa League runner-up: 2020–21

Individual
Brasileirão Série A Team of the Year – Best Left-back: 2013
Bola de Prata – Best Left-back: 2013
SJPF Primeira Liga Team of the Year: 2016, 2017
Primeira Liga Defender of the Month: August 2017, January 2018, February 2018, April 2018, August 2019, December 2019, February 2020
Primeira Liga Player of the Month: February 2020
Primeira Liga Team of the Year: 2017–18, 2018–19, 2019–20
Primeira Liga Goal of the Month: October/November 2019
FC Porto Player of the Year – Dragão de Ouro Award: 2018

References

External links

Grêmio profile 

1992 births
Living people
Brazilian people of Italian descent
People from Caxias do Sul
Brazilian footballers
Association football defenders
Esporte Clube Juventude players
Grêmio Foot-Ball Porto Alegrense players
Galatasaray S.K. footballers
Inter Milan players
FC Porto players
Manchester United F.C. players
Sevilla FC players
Campeonato Brasileiro Série A players
Campeonato Brasileiro Série D players
Süper Lig players
Serie A players
Primeira Liga players
Premier League players
La Liga players
Brazil international footballers
Brazilian expatriate footballers
Brazilian expatriate sportspeople in Turkey
Brazilian expatriate sportspeople in Italy
Brazilian expatriate sportspeople in Portugal
Brazilian expatriate sportspeople in England
Expatriate footballers in Turkey
Expatriate footballers in Italy
Expatriate footballers in Portugal
Expatriate footballers in England
Sportspeople from Rio Grande do Sul
2022 FIFA World Cup players